This list includes the official (de jure) world champion football clubs recognized by FIFA.
The official competitions that grant this title are the Intercontinental Cup (1960–2004) and the FIFA Club World Cup (2000, 2005–present).

Competitions

Intercontinental Cup
The Intercontinental Cup, also known as European/South American Cup, was an official international football competition endorsed by the Union of European Football Associations (UEFA) and the Confederación Sudamericana de Fútbol (CONMEBOL), contested between representative clubs from these confederations, usually the winners of the European Champions' Cup (now known as the UEFA Champions League), and the South American Copa Libertadores. The competition was played by representatives clubs of most developed continents in the football world; has since been replaced by the FIFA Club World Cup. All editions were official UEFA and CONMEBOL competitions, and indirectly also of FIFA.

From its formation in 1960 to 1979, the competition was contested over a two legged tie, with a playoff if necessary until 1968, and penalty kicks later. During the 1970s, European participation in the Intercontinental Cup became a running question due to controversial events in the 1969 final, and some European Champions Club' winner teams withdrew. From 1980 until 2004, the competition was contested over a single match held in Japan and sponsored by multinational automaker Toyota, which offered a secondary trophy (that flanked the original), the Toyota Cup.

Throughout the history of football, various attempts have been made to organize a tournament that identifies "the best club team in the world" – such as the Football World Championship, the Lipton Trophy, the Copa Rio, the Pequeña Copa del Mundo - due to FIFA's lack of interest or inability to organize club competitions.  The Intercontinental Cup is considered by FIFA as the official predecessor to the FIFA Club World Cup, which was held for the first time in 2000.

All the winning teams were regarded by worldwide mass media and the football community, FIFA included (as News Center productions and not cataloged on the FIFA website as official entity documents), as "world champions" de facto. On 27 October 2017, the FIFA Council, while not promoting statistical unification between the Intercontinental Cup and the Club World Cup, in respect to the history of the two tournaments (which merged in 2005), has officialised (de jure) the title of the Intercontinental Cup, recognising all the winners as official club world champions, with the same title of the FIFA Club World Cup winners, or "FIFA Club World Champions".

FIFA Club World Cup
The FIFA Club World Cup is an international men's association football competition organised by the Fédération Internationale de Football Association (FIFA), the sport's global governing body. The tournament officially assigns the world title. The competition was first contested in 2000 as the FIFA Club World Championship. It was not held between 2001 and 2004 due to a combination of factors, most importantly the collapse of FIFA's marketing partner International Sport and Leisure.  Since 2005, the competition has been held every year, and has been hosted by Brazil, Japan, the United Arab Emirates and Morocco. The FIFA Club World Cup's prestige is perceived quite differently in different parts of the football world; while it is widely regarded as the most distinguished club level trophy in South America, it struggles to attract interest in most of Europe compared to the UEFA Champions League and commonly lacks recognition as a high-ranking contest.

The first FIFA Club World Championship took place in Brazil in 2000. but the failure of ISL caused FIFA to discontinue the tournament and cancel the following year competition to be held in Spain. This first failed instalment ran parallel with the Intercontinental Cup (also known as European/South American Cup), a competition organised jointly by the Union of European Football Associations (UEFA) and the Confederación Sudamericana de Fútbol (CONMEBOL) first disputed in 1960 by the winners of the European Champions' Cup and the Copa Libertadores.  FIFA finally managed to buy the prestigious Japanese Event and in 2005, after the Intercontinental Cup's last edition, that competition was merged with FIFA. The failed FIFA Club World Cup's first edition was renamed as "FIFA Club World Championship" and a new Trophy replaced the Intercontintenal Cup Thophy as well as the Toyota Cup. In 2006, the tournament took its current name.

The current format of the tournament involves seven teams competing for the title at venues within the host nation over a period of about two weeks; the winners of that year's AFC Champions League (Asia), CAF Champions League (Africa), CONCACAF Champions League (North America), Copa Libertadores (South America), OFC Champions League (Oceania) and UEFA Champions League (Europe), along with the host nation's national champions, participate in a straight knock-out tournament. The host nation's national champions dispute a play-off against the Oceania champions, from which the winner joins the champions of Asia, Africa and North America at the quarter-finals. The quarter-final winners go on to face the European and South American champions, who enter at the semi-final stage, for a place in the final. In Europe the tournament is almost ignored by the mass media, also because of its sporting level, considered inferior to the Intercontinental Cup, indeed when the sides used to meet in a one-off game in Japan  (and even before), this was still a fair fight. The opening up of the global market in football has changed the balance. These days the best South Americans (and the stars from all the other continents) are usually playing in Europe.

Other

FIFA recognises the Intercontinental Cup as the sole direct predecessor of the Club World Cup, and the champions of both aforementioned competitions are the only ones uncontroversially officially recognised as Club World Champions in the FIFA Club World Cup Statistical Kit, the official document of FIFA's club competition.

On the recognition request of the 1951 worldwide club cup, see Copa Rio (international tournament).

Results by year

Intercontinental Cup era

Notes
 After the events of the 1969 Intercontinental Cup, many European Cup Champions refused to play in the Intercontinental Cup.
 #1 1970–71 European Cup finalists  Panathinaikos replaced the champions  Ajax who declined to participate.
 #2 1972–73 European Cup finalists  Juventus replaced the champions  Ajax who declined to contest the meeting in South America, officially for financial reasons.
 #3 1973–74 European Cup finalists  Atlético Madrid replaced the champions  Bayern Munich who declined to participate.
 #4 1976–77 European Cup finalists  Borussia Mönchengladbach replaced the champions  Liverpool who declined to participate.
 #5 1978–79 European Cup finalists  Malmö FF replaced the champions  Nottingham Forest who declined to participate.
 #6 1992–93 Champions League finalists  Milan replaced the champions  Marseille who were suspended due to a match fixing and bribery scandal.

Club World Cup era

Winners

By club

In synthesis FIFA has two types of world champions, those deriving from the Intercontinental Cup and those deriving from the Club World Cup (the two competitions, albeit different, confer the same title, that of FIFA club world champions) so in accordance to what is officially communicated by FIFA, the total count of official world titles is as follows:

Key

By country

By confederation

All-time runners-up without title

Key

See also 
 FIFA Club World Cup
Intercontinental Cup (football)
 Football World Championship
 Lipton Trophy
 Copa Rio
 Pequeña Copa del Mundo 
 FIFA
 List of association football competitions
 Non-FIFA international football

Notes

References 

Football